Cylindera filigera is a species of ground beetle of the subfamily Cicindelinae. It is found in Indonesia and Malaysia and is shiny blue in colour.

References

filigera
Beetles described in 1878
Beetles of Asia